The Juno Awards of 2000 were held in Toronto, Ontario, Canada during the weekend of 11–12 March 2000.

The primary ceremonies were hosted by The Moffatts at the SkyDome (now Rogers Centre) on 12 March 2000 and broadcast on CBC Television. This marked the first year that the award ceremonies were divided over two days, with non-televised award categories presented on 11 March.

The following award categories were nationally televised:

Best Female Artist
Best Male Artist
Best Country Male Vocalist
Best Group
Best New Group
Best Songwriter
Best Album
Best Selling Album (Foreign or Domestic)
Best Vocal Jazz Album
Canadian Music Hall of Fame

A new design for the Juno Award statuettes was created by artist Shirley Elford and introduced at this year's awards.

Nominations were announced 2 February 2000 in Toronto at the Glenn Gould Studio. Alanis Morissette received five nominations including one as director for Best Video.

Nominees and winners

Best Female Artist
Winner: Chantal Kreviazuk

Other Nominees:
 Celine Dion
 Lynda Lemay
 Amanda Marshall
 Alanis Morissette

Best Male Artist
Winner: Bryan Adams

Other Nominees:
 Paul Brandt
 Choclair
 Tom Cochrane
 Edwin

Best New Solo Artist
Winner: Tal Bachman

Other Nominees:
 Tory Cassis
 Tara Lyn Hart
 Jorane
 Ivana Santilli

Best Group
Winner: Matthew Good Band

Other Nominees:
 La Chicane
 Moist
 Our Lady Peace
 The Tea Party

Best New Group
Winner: Sky

Other Nominees:
 Gob
 Len
 Prozzäk
 Serial Joe

Best Songwriter
Winner: Shania Twain (co-Songwriter Robert John "Mutt" Lange), "Man! I Feel Like a Woman!", "That Don't Impress Me Much", "You've Got a Way"

Other Nominees:
 Tal Bachman, "If You Sleep", "She's So High"
 Bruce Cockburn, "Last Night of the World", "Mango", "Pacing the Cage"
 Amanda Marshall, "Believe in You" and "If I Didn't Have You" (co-writer Eric Bazilian), "Love Lift Me" (co-writers Eric Bazilian, Randy Cantor, John Bettis)
 Alanis Morissette, "So Pure", "Thank U", "Unsent"

Best Country Female Vocalist
Winner: Shania Twain

Other Nominees:
 Lisa Brokop
 Terri Clark
 Patricia Conroy
 Tara Lyn Hart

Best Country Male Vocalist
Winner: Paul Brandt

Other Nominees:
 Julian Austin
 John Landry
 Jamie Warren
 Jim Witter

Best Country Group or Duo
Winner: The Rankins

Other Nominees:
 Farmer's Daughter
 Lace
 Prairie Oyster
 The Wilkinsons

International Achievement Award
Winner: Sarah McLachlan

Best Producer
Winner: Tal Bachman and Bob Rock, "She's So High" and "If You Sleep" by Tal Bachman

Other Nominees:
 Arnold Lanni, "One Man Army" and "Is Anybody Home?" by Our Lady Peace
 Jeff Martin, "Heaven Coming Down" and "The Messenger" by The Tea Party
 Greg Wells, "Keep A Lid on Things" and "Get You in the Morning" by Crash Test Dummies
 Michael Phillip Wojewoda, "Puzzle Girl" and "You & Me" by Kim Stockwood

Best Recording Engineer
Winner: Paul Northfield and Jagori Tanna, "Summertime in the Void" and "When Did You Get Back From Mars?" by I Mother Earth

Other Nominees:
 Michael Banton-Jones, "Halfway to Heaven" by David Leask
 Richard Benoit, "Slow Bombing the World" by Marc Jordan
 Lenny DeRose, "Sucks To Be You" by Prozzäk, "Supersex 69" by The Philosopher Kings
 John Whynot and Colin Linden, "Last Night of the World" by Bruce Cockburn, "Lean on Your Peers" by Blackie and the Rodeo Kings

Canadian Music Hall of Fame
Winner: Bruce Fairbairn

Walt Grealis Special Achievement Award
Winner: Emile Berliner

Nominated and winning albums

Best Album
Winner:  Alanis Morissette, Supposed Former Infatuation Junkie

Other Nominees:
 Hot Show, Prozzäk
 On a Day Like Today, Bryan Adams
 These Are Special Times, Celine Dion
 Tuesday's Child, Amanda Marshall

Best Blues Album
Winner: Gust of Wind, Ray Bonneville

Other Nominees:
 Blues Party, by Chris Whiteley
 Call It What You Will, Steve Hill
 Down in the Groove, Jack de Keyzer
 Michael Jerome Browne, Michael Jerome Browne

Best Children's Album
Winner: Skinnamarink TV, Sharon, Lois and Bram

Other Nominees:
 Ants in Your Pants, Volume 1, Douglas John
 Les Petites Merveiles de Fanchon, Fanchon
 Play On..., Jam Sandwich
 Song of the Unicorn, Susan Hammond's Classical Kids

Best Classical Album (Solo or Chamber Ensemble)
Winner: Schumann: String Quartets, St. Lawrence String Quartet

Other Nominees:
 Bach: Well-Tempered Clarvier, Book 2, Angela Hewitt
 For the End of Time, Leila Josefowicz
 Naida Cole, Naida Cole
 Rzewiski: The People United Will Never Be Defeated!, Marc-Andre Hamelin

Best Classical Album (Large Ensemble)
Winner: Respighi: La Boutique Fantasque, Orchestre Symphonique de Montréal

Other Nominees:
 Brahms: Two Piano Concertos, Anton Kuerti, Orchestre Métropolitain
 Handel: Arias and Dances – Excerpts from Agrippina and Alcina, Tafelmusik, Karina Gauvin
 Nights in the Gardens of Spain, Angela Cheng, Hans Graf, Calgary Philharmonic Orchestra
 Vivaldi: Concerti for Strings, Les Violons du Roy

Best Classical Album (Vocal or Choral Performance)
Winner: German Romantic Opera, Ben Heppner

Other Nominees:
 Ae Fond Kiss, Edith Wiens, Rudolph Jansen, Judy Loman
 Bach: Arias & Oboe d'Amore, Daniel Taylor
 Heavenly Spheres, Studio de musique ancienne de Montréal
 Images de Noel, Karina Gauvin, Michael McMahon, Nora Shulman

Best Album Design
Winner: Michael Wrycraft (creative director), Radio Fusebox by Andy Stochansky

Other Nominees:
 Garnet Armstrong, Mark Bartkiw, Amo3ba Corp, Margaret Malandruccolo, Blue Green Orange by I Mother Earth
 Tom Chaggaris, Eve Egoyan, Johnnie Eisen, Thetihingsinbeteween by Eve Egoyan
 Anouk Lessard, Sebastien Toupin, Vent Fou by Jorane
 Catherine Stockhausen, Lee Towndrow, Between the Bridges by Sloan

Best Gospel Album
Winner: Legacy of Hope, Deborah Klassen

Other Nominees:
 God Only Knows, by The LaPointes
 Sheryl Stacey, by Sheryl Stacey
 Sinner and the Saint, by Jon Buller
 Sweetsalt, by Sweetsalt

Best Instrumental Album
Winner:  In My Hands, Natalie MacMaster

Other Nominees:
 Natural Sleep Inducement, David Bradstreet, Dan Gibson
 Piano Cascades, John Herberman, Dan Gibson
 The Piper's Legacy, Rob Crabtree, Oliver Schroer
 Utopia, Robert Michaels

Best Selling Album (Foreign or Domestic)
Winner:  Millennium, Backstreet Boys

Other Nominees:
 Americana, The Offspring
 ...Baby One More Time, Britney Spears
 Ricky Martin, Ricky Martin
 These Are Special Times, Celine Dion

Best Traditional Jazz Album – Instrumental
Winner: Deep in a Dream, Pat LaBarbera

Other Nominees:
 Art & Soul, Renee Rosnes
 New Horizons, Bernie Senensky Quintet
 P.J. Perry & The Edmonton Symphony Orchestra, P.J. Perry
 Time Warp Plays the Music of Duke Ellington, Time Warp

Best Contemporary Jazz Album – Instrumental
Winner: ...so far, D.D. Jackson

Other Nominees:
 Blue Jade, Joe Sealy and Paul Novotny
 The Field, Jeff Johnston
 Freeflight, Bob Shaw and Freeflight
 Puzzle City, Jean-Pierre Zanella

Best Vocal Jazz Album
Winner: When I Look in Your Eyes, Diana Krall

Other Nominees:
 How My Heart Sings, Kate Hammett-Vaughan
 I've Got Your Number, Jeri Brown
 Swing Ladies, Swing!, Carol Welsman
 There's Beauty in the Rain, Karin Plato

Best Roots or Traditional Album – Group
Winner: Kings of Love, Blackie & The Rodeo Kings

Other Nominees:
 Encore!, Barachois
 The Road to Canso, Scruj MacDuhk
 Turn, Great Big Sea
 Xième, La Bottine Souriante

Best Roots or Traditional Album – Solo
Winner:  Breakfast in New Orleans, Dinner in Timbuktu, Bruce Cockburn

Other Nominees:
 Gentleman of Leisure, Jesse Winchester
 In My Hands, Natalie MacMaster
 Lan Duil, Mary Jane Lamond
 Whereabouts, Ron Sexsmith

Best Alternative Album
Winner: Julie Doiron and the Wooden Stars, Julie Doiron and Wooden Stars

Other Nominees:
 Clayton Park, Thrush Hermit
 My Love Is Bold, Danko Jones
 Sometimes I Cry, Tricky Woo
 You Can't Stop the Bum Rush, Len

Best Selling Francophone Album
Winner:  En Catimini, La Chicane

Other Nominees:
 D'Autres rives, Bruno Pelletier
 Les Fourmis, Jean Leloup
 Live, Lynda Lemay
 Notre-Dame de Paris, various artists

Best Pop/Adult Album
Winner:  Colour Moving and Still, Chantal Kreviazuk

Other Nominees:
 On a Day Like Today, Bryan Adams
 Supposed Former Infatuation Junkie, Alanis Morissette
 Tal Bachman, Tal Bachman
 Taming the Tiger, Joni Mitchell

Best Rock Album
Winner:  Beautiful Midnight, Matthew Good Band

Other Nominees:
 Another Spin Around the Sun, Edwin
 Happiness...Is Not a Fish That You Can Catch, Our Lady Peace
 Mercedes 5 and Dime, Moist
 Triptych, The Tea Party

Nominated and winning releases

Best Single
Winner: "Bobcaygeon", The Tragically Hip

Other Nominees:
 "Heaven Coming Down", The Tea Party
 "Hello Time Bomb", Matthew Good Band
 "Steal My Sunshine", Len
 "Sucks to Be You", Prozzäk

Best Classical Composition
Winner: Shattered Night, Shivering Stars, Alexina Louie

Other Nominees:
 Arc, Alexina Louie
 String Quartet No. 1, Glenn Buhr
 The Book of Mirrors, Gary Kulesha
 Winter Poems, Glenn Buhr

Best Rap Recording
Winner:  Ice Cold, Choclair

Other Nominees:
 Deliverance, Citizen Kane
 Global Warning, Rascalz
 Money or Love, Saukrates
 Don't Wanna Be Your Slave, Michie Mee with Esthero

Best R&B/Soul Recording
Winner: Thinkin' About You, 2Rude featuring Snow, Smoothe tha Hustler, Latoya & Miranda

Other Nominees:
 All My Love, Michael Clarke
 Brown, Ivana Santilli
 Nodeja, Nodeja
 Tha Crab Theory, Blacklisted featuring ORA, Taj and Deslisha Thomas

Best Music of Aboriginal Canada Recording
Winner: Falling Down, Chester Knight and the Wind

Other Nominees:
 Love that Strong, Elizabeth Hill
 To Bring Back Yesterday, Fara Palmer
 Touch the Earth and Sky, Vern Cheechoo
 World Hand Drum Champions '98, Red Bull

Best Reggae Recording
Winner: Heart & Soul, Lazo

Other Nominees:
 Hard End, The Luge Sessions
 Sometimes, Choices
 Thanks and Devotion, Willi Williams
 What If I Told You, Andru Branch

Best Global Album
Winner: Omnisource, Madagascar Slim

Other Nominees:
 Bambatulu, Lilison Di Kinara
 Entente Cordiale, Show-Do-Man
 Firedance, Toronto Tabla Ensemble
 Jongo Le'', Celso Machado

Best Dance Recording
Winner: "Silence", Delerium

Other Nominees:
 "Arriba", Joee
 "Dancing in the Key of Love", Temperance
 "Over and Over", Emjay
 "The Rush Won't Stop", Steve Austin

Best Video
Winner: Alanis Morissette, "So Pure" by Alanis Morissette

Other Nominees:
 Ulf Buddensieck, "Underground" by Moist
 Marc Lostracco,  "Strange Disease" by Prozzäk
 Andrew MacNaughtan, "On the Scene" by Big Sugar
 William Morrison, "Hello Time Bomb" by Matthew Good Band

External links 

Juno Awards site

References 

2000
2000 music awards
2000 in Canadian music
March 2000 events in North America
2000 in Toronto